Cosmophasis squamata is a species of jumping spider in the family Salticidae, native to the Solomon Islands and Seychelles . It was described by Władysław Kulczyński in 1910.

Description
The holotype of this species is a female and the mature male is undescribed, although a premature male has been spotted. It is possible that Cosmophasis bandaneira  might be the male.

References 

Salticidae
Fauna of the Solomon Islands